Uzana II of Pagan (also Saw Mun Nit; 1311–1368) was viceroy of Pagan (Bagan) from 1325 to 1364 under the suzerain of Pinya Kingdom, and from 1365 to 1368/69 under the Ava Kingdom. He was also the last of the Pagan dynasty which dated back at least to the mid-9th century. Though still styled as King of Pagan, Uzana's effective rule, like his father's and grandfather's, amounted to just the area around Pagan city. King Swa Saw Ke of Ava (r. 1367–1400) was a nephew of Uzana II.

Historiography
Uzana was a son of Saw Hnit, the vassal king of Pagan. The table below lists the dates given by the four main chronicles.

References

Bibliography
 
 

Pagan dynasty
Pinya dynasty
Ava dynasty
14th-century Burmese people